Infatuation or being smitten is the state of being carried away by an unreasoned passion, usually towards another person for whom one has developed strong romantic feelings. Psychologist Frank D. Cox says that infatuation can be distinguished from romantic love only when looking back on a particular case of being attracted to a person. Infatuation may also develop into a mature love. Goldstein and Brandon describe infatuation as the first stage of a relationship before developing into a mature intimacy. Whereas love is "a warm attachment, enthusiasm, or devotion to another person", infatuation is "a feeling of foolish or obsessively strong love for, admiration for, or interest in someone or something", a shallower "honeymoon phase" in a relationship. Dr. Ian Kerner, a sex therapist, states that infatuation usually occurs at the start of relationships, is "...usually marked by a sense of excitement and euphoria, and it's often accompanied by lust and a feeling of newness and rapid expansion with a person". Phillips describes how the illusions of infatuations inevitably lead to disappointment when learning the truth about a lover. Adolescents often make people an object of extravagant, short-lived passion or temporary love.

Youth

"It is customary to view young people's dating relationships and first relationships as puppy love or infatuation"; and if infatuation is both an early stage in a deepening sequence of love/attachment, and at the same time a potential stopping point, it is perhaps no surprise that it is a condition especially prevalent in the first, youthful explorations of the world of relationships. Thus "the first passionate adoration of a youth for a celebrated actress whom he regards as far above him, to whom he scarcely dares lift his bashful eyes" may be seen as part of an "infatuation with celebrity especially perilous with the young".

Admiration plays a significant part in this, as "in the case of a schoolgirl crush on a boy or on a male teacher. The girl starts off admiring the teacher ... [then] may get hung up on the teacher and follow him around". Then there may be shame at being confronted with the fact that "you've got what's called a crush on him ... Think if someone was hanging around you, pestering and sighing". Of course, "sex may come into this ... with an infatuated schoolgirl or schoolboy" as well, producing the "stricken gaze, a compulsive movement of the throat ... an 'I'm lying down and I don't care if you walk on me, babe', expression" of infatuation. Such a cocktail of emotions "may even falsify the 'erotic sense of reality': when a person in love estimates his partner's virtues he is usually not very realistic ... projection of all his ideals onto the partner's personality".

It is this projection that differentiates infatuation from love, according to the spiritual teacher Meher Baba: "In infatuation, the person is a passive victim of the spell of conceived attraction for the object. In love there is an active appreciation of the intrinsic worth of the object of love."

Distance from the object of infatuation—as with celebrities—can help maintain the infatuated state. A time-honoured cure for the one who "has a tendre ... infatuated" is to have "thrown them continually together ... by doing so you will cure ... [or] you will know that it is not an infatuation".

Types
Three types of infatuation have been identified by Brown: the first type is characterized by being "carried away, without insight or proper evaluative judgement, by blind desire"; the second, closely related, by being "compelled by a desire or craving over which the agent has no control" while "the agent's evaluation ... may well be sound although the craving or love remains unaffected by it"; and the third is that of "the agent who exhibits bad judgement and misvaluation for reasons such as ignorance or recklessness".

In transference

In psychoanalysis, a sign that the method is taking hold is "the initial infatuation to be observed at the beginning of treatment", the beginning of transference. The patient, in Freud's words, "develops a special interest in the person of the doctor ... never tires in his home of praising the doctor and of extolling ever new qualities in him". What occurs, "it is usually maintained ... is a sort of false love, a shadow of love", replicating in its course the infatuations of "what is called true love".

However, psychoanalyst Janet Malcolm claims that it is wrong to convince the patient "that their love is an illusion ... that it's not you she loves. Freud was off base when he wrote that. It is you. Who else could it be?"—thereby taking "the question of what is called true love ... further than it had ever been taken".

Conversely, in countertransference, the therapist may become infatuated with his/her client: "very good-looking ... she was the most gratifying of patients. She made literary allusions and understood the ones he made ... He was dazzled by her, a little in love with her. After two years, the analysis ground down to a horrible halt".

Intellectual infatuations

Infatuations need not only involve people, but can extend to objects, activities, and ideas. "Men are always falling in love with other men ... with their war heroes and sport heroes": with institutions, discourses and role models. Thus for example Jung's initial unconditional devotion' to Freud's theories and his 'no less unconditional veneration' of Freud's person' was seen at the time by both men as a 'quasi-religious infatuation' to ... a cult object"; while Freud in turn was "very attracted by Jung's personality", perhaps "saw in Jung an idealized version of himself": a mutual admiration society—"intellectually infatuated with one another".

But there are also collective infatuations: "we are all prone to being drawn into social phantasy systems". Thus, for instance, "the recent intellectual infatuation with structuralism and post-structuralism" arguably lasted at least until "September 11 ended intellectual infatuation with postmodernism" as a whole.

Economic bubbles thrive on collective infatuations of a different kind: "all boom-bust processes contain an element of misunderstanding or misconception", whether it is the "infatuation with ... becoming the latest dot.com billionaire", or the one that followed with subprime mortgages, once "Greenspan had replaced the tech bubble with a housing bubble". As markets "swung virtually overnight from euphoria to fear" in the credit crunch, even the most hardened market fundamentalist had to concede that such "periodic surges of euphoria and fear are manifestations of deep-seated aspects of human nature"—whether these are enacted in home-room infatuations or upon the global stage.

Literary depictions

Shakespeare's sonnets have been described as a "Poetics for Infatuation"; as being dominated by one theme, and "that theme is infatuation, its initiation, cultivation, and history, together with its peaks of triumph and devastation"—a lengthy exploration of the condition of being "subject to the appropriate disorders that belong to our infatuation ... the condition of infatuation". In Turgenev's First Love, a novella from 1860, 16-year-old Woldemar becomes rapturously infatuated with Zinaida, the beautiful daughter of a princess who lives next to his house. Even though she does spend time with him, his intense infatuation is unrequited and he sinks into depression.

See also

References

Further reading
 Grohol, J. Phys.D (2006). "Love Versus Infatuation", Retrieved: Nov 24th 2008
 Harville, H. PhD. (1992). Keeping the Love You Find, New York: Pocket Books.
 Glencoe/McGraw-Hill. (2000). Whitney, DeBruyne, Sizer-Webb, Health: Making Life Choices (pp. 494–496)

Interpersonal relationships
Emotions
Love